José Eduardo Agualusa Alves da Cunha (born December 13, 1960) is an Angolan journalist and writer of Portuguese and Brazilian descent. He studied agronomy and silviculture in Lisbon, Portugal. Currently he resides in the Island of Mozambique, working as a writer and journalist. He also has been working to establish a public library on the island.

Agualusa writes predominantly in his native language, Portuguese. His books have been translated into twenty-five languages, most notably into English by translator Daniel Hahn, a frequent collaborator of his. Much of his writing focuses on the history of Angola.

He has seen some success in English-speaking literary circles, most notably for A General Theory of Oblivion. That novel, written in 2012 and translated in 2015, was shortlisted for the 2016 Man Booker International Prize, and was the recipient of the 2017 International Dublin Literary Award.

Bibliography 
 A Conjura (novel, 1989)
 D. Nicolau Água-Rosada e outras estórias verdadeiras e inverosímeis (short stories, 1990)
 O coração dos bosques (poetry, 1991)
 A feira dos assombrados (novella, 1992)
 Estação das Chuvas (novel, 1996)
 Nação Crioula (novel, 1997)
 Fronteiras Perdidas, contos para viajar (short stories, 1999)
 Um estranho em Goa (novel, 2000)
 Estranhões e Bizarrocos (juvenile literature, 2000)
 A Substância do Amor e Outras Crónicas (chronicles, 2000)
 O Homem que Parecia um Domingo (short stories, 2002)
 Catálogo de Sombras (short stories, 2003)
 O Ano em que Zumbi Tomou o Rio (novel, 2003)
 O Vendedor de Passados (novel, 2004)
 Manual Prático de Levitação (short stories, 2005)
 As Mulheres de Meu Pai (novel, 2007)
 Na rota das especiarias (guide, 2008)
 Barroco tropical (novel, 2009)
 Milagrário Pessoal (novel, 2010)
 Teoria Geral do Esquecimento (novel, 2012)
 A educação sentimental dos pássaros (novel, 2012)
 A Vida no Céu (novel, 2013)
 A Rainha Ginga (novel, 2014)
 O Livro dos Camaleões (short stories, 2015)
 A sociedade dos sonhadores involuntários (2017) The Society of Reluctant Dreamers, trans. Daniel Hahn (2019).
 Os Vivos e os Outros (novel, 2020)

He has also published, in collaboration with fellow journalist Fernando Semedo and photographer Elza Rocha, a work of investigative reporting on the African community of Lisbon, entitled Lisboa Africana (1993). Agualusa's play Aquela Mulher was performed by Brazilian actress Marília Gabriela (directed by Antônio Fagundes) in São Paulo, Brazil, in 2008 and Rio de Janeiro, Brazil, in 2009. He co-wrote the play Chovem amores na Rua do Matador with Mozambican writer Mia Couto.

Translated works 
These novels were all translated into English by Daniel Hahn:

 Creole (Nação Crioula—novel, 2002): Tells the story of a secret love between the fictional Portuguese adventurer Carlos Fradique Mendes (a creation of the 19th-century Portuguese novelist Eça de Queiroz) and Ana Olímpia de Caminha, a former slave who became one of the wealthiest persons in Angola.
 The Book of Chameleons (O Vendedor de Passados—novel, 2004): An excerpt appeared in Gods and Soldiers: The Penguin Anthology of Contemporary African Writing in 2009.
 My Father's Wives (As Mulheres de Meu Pai—novel, 2008)
 Rainy Season (Estação das Chuvas—novel, 2009): A biographical novel about Lidia do Carmo Ferreira, the Angolan poet and historian who disappeared mysteriously in Luanda in 1992.
 A General Theory of Oblivion (Teoria Geral do Esquecimento—novel, 2015): Tells the history of Angola from the perspective of a woman named Ludo who barricades herself in her Luandan apartment for three decades—beginning the day before the country's independence.
 A Practical Guide to Levitation: Stories (forthcoming)
 The Living and the Rest (forthcoming)

Non-fiction work 
Agualusa writes monthly for the Portuguese magazine LER and weekly for the Brazilian newspaper O Globo and the Angolan portal Rede Angola. He hosts the radio program A Hora das Cigarras, about African music and poetry, on the channel RDP África. In 2006, he launched, with Conceição Lopes and Fatima Otero, the Brazilian publisher Língua Geral, dedicated exclusively to Portuguese-language authors.

Criticism and interpretation 
Agualusa's work was described by Ana Mafalda Leite as sometimes providing "a link between history and fiction, between the account of past events and the description of what might have been possible." The critic continues, "The author tries...to capture the moment in which history becomes literature, to illustrate how literary imagination takes precedence over the historical by means of the fantastic and an oneiric vision of life." Her assessment of the author's skills is as follows: "Agualusa gives evidence not just of solid historical research but also of the literary talent which brings these characters to life."

Awards 
In June 2017, Agualusa, alongside Daniel Hahn, his translator, was awarded the International Dublin Literary Award for his novel A General Theory of Oblivion. Agualusa's work beat a shortlist of ten titles from around the world, including one written by Irish author Anne Enright, to claim the €100,000 prize. Agualusa was awarded €75,000 personally, as the translator, Daniel Hahn, was entitled to a €25,000 share of the prize money.

Nação Crioula (1997) was awarded the RTP Great Literary Prize.
The Book of Chameleons (2006) won the Independent Foreign Fiction Prize in 2007. He is the first African writer to win the award since its inception in 1990.

Agualusa benefited from three literary grants: the first awarded by the Portuguese Centro Nacional de Cultura in 1997 to write Nação Crioula (Creole); the second given in the year 2000 by the Portuguese Fundação Oriente allowing him to visit Goa, India, for three months which resulted in Um estranho em Goa; the third, in 2001, was prestiged by the German Deutscher Akademischer Austauschdienst. Thanks to that grant, he lived one year in Berlin, where he wrote O Ano em que Zumbi Tomou o Rio. In 2009, he was invited by the Dutch Residency for Writers in Amsterdam, where he wrote Barroco Tropical.

References

Further reading 
 Brookshaw, David. 2002. Voices from Lusophone borderlands: the Angolan identities of António Agostinho Neto, Jorge Arrimar and José Eduardo Agualusa. Maynooth: National University of Ireland, Maynooth.
 Guterres, Maria. "History and Fiction in José Eduardo Agualusa's Novels." Fiction in the Portuguese-Speaking World. Ed. Charles M. Kelley. Cardiff: University of Wales Press, 2000. pp. 117–38. Print.

External links 
 Homepage of José Eduardo Agualusa
 Biography from the international literature festival berlin
 "Angolan author wins fiction prize", BBC News, 1 May 2007
 "An Interview with José Eduardo Agualusa"
 "A General Theory Of Oblivion by José Eduardo Agualusa; trans. Daniel Hahn, book review", The Independent, 2 July 2015
 "A General Theory of Oblivion by José Eduardo Agualusa—Review", The Big Issue, 15 July 2015

1960 births
Living people
People from Huambo
Angolan people of Portuguese descent
Angolan people of Brazilian descent
Angolan writers
Angolan radio presenters
Angolan journalists
Angolan newspaper journalists